is a railway station in Itoda, Fukuoka Prefecture, Japan. It is on the Ita Line and is the northern terminus of the Itoda Line, both operated by the Heisei Chikuhō Railway. Trains arrive roughly every hour.

On 1 April 2009, two local onsen operators, Fujiyunosato and Hinōnoyu-Onsen, acquired naming rights to the station.

External links
Kanada Station (Heisei Chikuhō Railway website)

References

Railway stations in Fukuoka Prefecture
Railway stations in Japan opened in 1893
Heisei Chikuhō Railway Ita Line
Heisei Chikuhō Railway Itoda Line